Crewe United Football Club is an intermediate-level football club playing in the Intermediate A division of the Mid-Ulster Football League in Northern Ireland. The club hails from Glenavy in County Antrim. The club was formed as Sparta in 1961 and played in the West Belfast League before joining the Northern Amateur League in 1968. In 1971, the club switched to the Lisburn League, and during its time there it change its name to Crewe United. In 1978, Crewe returned to the Amateur League, and gained intermediate status following a Junior Cup win in 1983.

George Best played his last game in Northern Ireland for Crewe United in 1995 at Crewe Park in a Charity game. Crewe are renowned for their progressive thinking and have some of the best facilities in Intermediate Football and recently constructed a new playing surface at Crewe Park. They have also played games in many different countries, most notably Holland, and played BVO Emmen in 1999 in front of 2,699 people. Many English league sides such as Brentford and Luton Town have played at Crewe Park

Honours

Intermediate honours
Marshall Cup: 1
2016–17

Junior honours
Irish Junior Cup: 1
1982–83

Players

External links
 Crewe United Official Club website
 Daily Mirror Mid-Ulster Football League Official website
 nifootball.co.uk - (For fixtures, results and tables of all Northern Ireland amateur football leagues)

Notes

Association football clubs in Northern Ireland
Association football clubs established in 1961
Association football clubs in County Antrim
Mid-Ulster Football League clubs
1961 establishments in Northern Ireland